Bárbara Rebolledo Sánchez (born 22 January 1973) is a Chilean television presenter. For years, she was the face of Televisión Nacional de Chile and, since 2015, she has hosted Culture in the city of 13C.

Trajectory 
She did her professional practice in the program of Channel 13 Nuestra Hora and had participations in other programs of the same television station. She also worked at Mega and joined TVN in the program Buenos días a todos, where he stayed for four years. She replaced Eli from Caso due to the latter's illness, on the program Buenas tardes Eli. Aguirre conducted the program Día a día a día and the program La Ruta de Beringia with Ricardo Astorga.

In 2004, she premiered the program Passions that she conducted with Felipe Camiroaga and then with Martin Cárcamo, and her last season she conducted it alone. She animated the first and second season of Peloton with Felipe Camiroaga and also conducted the program Abre los ojos, where she interviewed those eliminated from this reality show. After five years of animating the program Passions, it ended in 2008, and with this she decided to leave television. In 2013, he reappears with a program called En la vereda on TVSenado and in 2015 with Cultura en la ciudad on Canal 13C. In 2019, she works as a hostess with Daniel Valenzuela in a cable channel called "Cariño malo".

References

External links 

 

1973 births
People from Talca
Chilean women journalists
Chilean television presenters
Living people
Chilean women television presenters
Chilean television personalities
Chilean politicians
Members of the Chilean Constitutional Convention
Gabriela Mistral University alumni